The members of the 19th General Assembly of Newfoundland were elected in the Newfoundland general election held in November 1900. The general assembly sat from 1901 to 1904.

The Liberal Party led by Robert Bond formed the government.

Lawrence Furlong was chosen as speaker.

Sir Charles Cavendish Boyle served as colonial governor of Newfoundland.

Members of the Assembly 
The following members were elected to the assembly in 1900:

Notes:

By-elections 
By-elections were held to replace members for various reasons:

Notes:

References 

Terms of the General Assembly of Newfoundland and Labrador